Ide Kaoru (井手薰,いで かおる, February 6, 1879 - May 11, 1944) was Chief Architect of the Governor-General's Office in Taiwan, when the island was part of the Japanese Empire. He held office in the Building and Repairs section of the Japanese Government-General in Taiwan, and was mainly involved with government and municipal building projects. His distinctive architectural ideas influenced the Taiwanese architectural profession. He was born in Gifu Prefecture Japan.

Ide Kaoru favoured a "localisation" approach to Taiwan's architecture. He was an advocate of using reinforced concrete, and this featured in almost all his works. Seismic resistance was of the highest priority, as Taiwan is prone to earthquakes.

Amongst Ide's most notable works was the Zhongshan Hall in Taipei, which remains in daily use today as a concert hall and cultural centre. Over the years, many receptions have been held there for heads of state and foreign dignitaries, and in 1992 it was designated a Class Two National Historical Site. He also designed the Judicial Yuan Building in the Imperial Crown style, which was completed in 1934. His design for the Executive Yuan building (completed 1940) was influenced by Art Deco and the work of Frank Lloyd Wright.

Ide graduated from Tokyo Imperial University in 1906, then moved to Taiwan in 1911. He was one of the few Japanese architects to immerse himself professionally in Taiwan, and stayed there for more than thirty years. He also wrote extensively on the subject of architecture.

Notable works

Taipei Presbyterian Church (1916)
Chienkung Shrine (Kenkō Jinja, 建功神社, 1928) N.B. Heavily modified from its original design after WWII.
Taipei University School Building and Lecture Hall (1928)
Taipei Taiwan Education Hall (1931)
Judicial Office Building (1934)
Commemorative Exposition of the Beginning of the Governance of Taiwan for 40 years (1935)
Hsinchu Police Headquarters (1935)
Taipei Zhongshan Hall (1936, originally Taipei City Public Auditorium)
Kaohsiung Customs House (1936)
Taipei Police Headquarters (1936)
Chiayi Police Headquarters (1937)
Executive Yuan building (1940)

References

External links 
 History Exhibit of Taiwan's Executive Yuan (Parliament) building. 
  Judicial Yuan website 
  Zhongshan Hall website 

20th-century Japanese architects
University of Tokyo alumni
1879 births
1944 deaths
19th-century Japanese architects
Imperial Crown Style architecture
Members of the Government-General of Taiwan